, also known as  or WPB, is a Japanese weekly magazine published by Shueisha since 1966. Although the magazine publishes a variety of news and special interest articles, columns, celebrity interviews, and manga, it is considered an adult magazine. The target demographic is men, and each issue features several nude pictorials of female models.

This magazine is not a regional edition of the American Playboy magazine; the Japanese edition of that magazine was published as Monthly Playboy (MPB) by Shueisha until its cancellation in January 2009.

Manga in WPB
 Circuit no Ōkami II: Modena no Tsurugi by Satoshi Ikezawa
 Lady Snowblood (修羅雪姫) by Kazuo Koike and Kazuo Kamimura
 Modena no Ken (モデナの剣) by Satoshi Ikezawa
 My Favorite Carrera (彼女のカレラ) by Kia Asamiya
 Ore no Sora (俺の空) by Hiroshi Motomiya
 Polo Shirt and Upper Cut by Norifusa Mita
 The First President of Japan by Yoshiki Hidaka and Ryuji Tsugihara
 Taiyō no Makibaō by Tsunomaru 
 Ultimate Muscle by Yudetamago
 Beat Shot!! by Satoshi Ikezawa
 Sakigake!! Otokojuku by Akira Miyashita

References

External links
 Weekly Playboy Online
  (Lists appearances in Weekly Playboy from 1966 to 2011.

1966 establishments in Japan
Men's magazines published in Japan
Weekly magazines published in Japan
Magazines established in 1966
Shueisha magazines